Tick paralysis is the only tick-borne disease that is not caused by an infectious organism. The illness is caused by a neurotoxin produced in the tick's salivary gland. After prolonged attachment, the engorged tick transmits the toxin to its host. The incidence of tick paralysis is unknown. Patients can experience severe respiratory distress (similar to anaphylaxis).

Signs and symptoms

Tick paralysis results from injection of a toxin from tick salivary glands during a blood meal.  The toxin causes symptoms within 2–7 days, beginning with weakness in both legs that progresses to paralysis. The paralysis ascends to the trunk, arms, and head within hours and may lead to respiratory failure and death. The disease can present as acute ataxia without muscle weakness.

Patients may report minor sensory symptoms, such as local numbness, but constitutional signs are usually absent. Deep tendon reflexes are usually decreased or absent, and ophthalmoplegia and bulbar palsy can occur.

Electromyographic (EMG) studies usually show a variable reduction in the amplitude of compound muscle action potentials, but no abnormalities of repetitive nerve stimulation studies. These appear to result from a failure of acetylcholine release at the motor nerve terminal level. There may be subtle abnormalities of motor nerve conduction velocity and sensory action potentials.

Pathogenesis
Tick paralysis is believed to be due to toxins found in the tick's saliva that enter the bloodstream while the tick is feeding.  The two ticks most commonly associated with North American tick paralysis are the Rocky Mountain wood tick (Dermacentor andersoni) and the American dog tick (Dermacentor variabilis); however, 43 tick species have been implicated in human disease around the world. Most North American cases of tick paralysis occur from April to June, when adult Dermacentor ticks emerge from hibernation and actively seek hosts.  In Australia, tick paralysis is caused by the tick Ixodes holocyclus.  Prior to 1989, 20 fatal cases were reported in Australia.

Although tick paralysis is of concern in domestic animals and livestock in the United States as well, human cases are rare and usually occur in children under the age of 10.

Tick paralysis occurs when an engorged and gravid (egg-laden) female tick produces a neurotoxin in its salivary glands and transmits it to its host during feeding. Experiments have indicated that the greatest amount of toxin is produced between the fifth and seventh day of attachment (often initiating or increasing the severity of symptoms), although the timing may vary depending on the species of tick.

Unlike Lyme disease, ehrlichiosis, and babesiosis, which are caused by the systemic proliferation and expansion of parasites in their hosts long after the offending tick is gone, tick paralysis is chemically induced by the tick and therefore usually only continues in its presence. Once the tick is removed, symptoms usually diminish rapidly. However, in some cases, profound paralysis can develop and even become fatal before anyone becomes aware of a tick's presence.

Diagnosis
Diagnosis is based on symptoms and upon finding an embedded tick, usually on the scalp.

In the absence of a tick, the differential diagnosis includes Guillain–Barré syndrome. Early signs of tick poisoning could be a change of an animals' ‘voice’, weakness in the back legs or vomiting.

Prevention

No human vaccine is currently available for any tick-borne disease, except for tick-borne encephalitis. Individuals should therefore take precautions when entering tick-infested areas, particularly in the spring and summer months. Preventive measures include avoiding trails that are overgrown with bushy vegetation, wearing light-coloured clothes that allow one to see the ticks more easily, and wearing long pants and closed-toe shoes. Tick repellents containing DEET (N,N, diethyl-m-toluamide) are only marginally effective and can be applied to skin or clothing. Rarely, severe reactions can occur in some people who use DEET-containing products. Young children may be especially vulnerable to these adverse effects. Permethrin, which can only be applied to clothing, is much more effective in preventing tick bites.  Permethrin is not a repellent but rather an insecticide; it causes ticks to curl up and fall off the protected clothing.

Treatment

Removal of the offending tick usually results in resolution of symptoms within several hours to days. If the tick is not removed, the toxin can be fatal.  A 1969 study of children reported mortality rates of 10 – 12 percent, mostly due to respiratory paralysis.  The tick is best removed by grasping it as close to the skin as possible and pulling in a firm steady manner.  Because the toxin lies in the tick's salivary glands, care must be taken to remove the entire tick (including the head), or symptoms may persist.

It is important to note that, unlike the toxin of other tick species, the toxin of Ixodes holocyclus (Australian paralysis tick) may still be fatal even if the tick is removed.

For affected animals, food and water intake can worsen the outcome, as the toxin can prevent the animal from swallowing properly. People who find a tick on their animal, are advised to remove it immediately and seek veterinary assistance if the animal shows any signs of illness. The tick can be placed in a tightly sealed plastic bag and taken to a veterinarian for identification.

Research

Although several attempts have been made to isolate and identify the neurotoxin since the first isolation in 1966, the exact structure of the toxin has still not been published. The 40-80 kDa protein fraction contains the toxin.

The neurotoxin structure and gene, at least for the tick species Ixodes holocyclus have since been identified and are called holocyclotoxins after the species. At least three members (HT-1, HT-3, and HT-12) trigger paralysis by presynaptic inhibition of neurotransmitter release via a calcium dependent mechanism resulting in a reduction of quantal content, and loss of effective neuromuscular synaptic transmission.

Culture

In the TV show, Hart of Dixie, Season 1, Episode 2, a patient is diagnosed with tick paralysis who has been deer hunting.

In the TV show, Emergency!, Season 5, Episode 4, "Equipment" (first aired Oct. 4, 1975), Dr. Joe Early diagnoses a young boy who has fallen from a tree with tick paralysis, after eliminating polio as a cause.

In the TV show, House, Season 2, Episode 16, "Safe", Dr House diagnoses a patient (played by Michelle Trachtenberg) with tick paralysis.

In the TV show, Remedy, Season 1 Episode 7, "Tomorrow, the Green Grass", Rebecca is diagnosed with tick paralysis.

In the TV show, Royal Pains, Season 1 Episode 3, "Strategic Planning", a US Senator's teenage son is diagnosed with and overcomes tick paralysis.

In the TV show, Chicago Med, Season 3, Episode 5, "Mountains and Molehills", a young girl returning from Australia with increasing paralysis is diagnosed with tick paralysis.

See also
 Polyneuropathy in dogs and cats for tick paralysis in dogs
 Tick-borne disease

References

External links 

Neurological disorders
Tick-borne diseases